Carlos Cruz, (born on December 21, 1960 in Caracas, Venezuela), is a Venezuelan actor. Best known for appearing in telenovelas.

Filmography

Films

Television

References

External links 

1960 births
Living people
Venezuelan male telenovela actors
20th-century Venezuelan male actors
21st-century Venezuelan male actors
Venezuelan male film actors
People from Caracas